from the University of Electro-Communications, Chofu, Tokyo, Japan was named Fellow of the Institute of Electrical and Electronics Engineers in 2013 for contributions to high-performance packet switching and path computation technologies.

References

Fellow Members of the IEEE
Living people
Year of birth missing (living people)
Place of birth missing (living people)